{{Infobox person
| honorific_prefix   = 
| name               = Akash Kapur
| honorific_suffix   = 
| native_name        = 
| native_name_lang   = 
| image              = 
| alt                = 
| caption            = 
| birth_name         = 
| birth_date         = 
| birth_place        = Nagpur, India
| disappeared_date   = 
| disappeared_place  = 
| disappeared_status = 
| death_date         = 
| death_place        = 
| death_cause        = 
| body_discovered    = 
| resting_place      = 
| resting_place_coordinates = 
| monuments          = 
| nationality        = Indian-American
| other_names        = 
| citizenship        = 
| education          = 
| alma_mater         = 
| occupation         = Author, journalist
| years_active       = 
| employer           = 
| organization       = 
| known_for          = 
| notable_works      = India Becoming, Better to Have Gone
| style              = 
| height             = 
| television         = 
| title              = 
| term               = 
| predecessor        = 
| party              = 
| movement           = 
| opponents          = 
| boards             = 
| criminal_charge    = 
| criminal_penalty   = 
| criminal_status    = 
| spouse             = 
| partner            = 
| children           = 
| parents            = 
| relatives          = 
| callsign           = 
| awards             = 
| signature          = 
| signature_alt      = 
| signature_size     = 
| module             = 
| module2            = 
| module3            = 
| module4            = 
| module5            = 
| module6            = 
| website            = http://www.akashkapur.com/
| footnotes          = 
}}

Akash Kapur is an Indian-American journalist and author. He is the author of two books, India Becoming (Penguin/Riverhead, 2012) and Better to Have Gone (Scribner, 2021); and the editor of one, Auroville: Dream and Reality (Penguin, 2018).  He is the former "Letter from India" columnist for the international New York Times, and has published his work in various magazines and journals around the world. In 2018, Kapur was awarded a Whiting Nonfiction Grant for  Better to Have Gone. In 2021, Better to Have Gone was an Amazon bestseller and was named a book of the year by The New York Times, The Wall Street Journal ("Writers' Favorite Books"), CNN, The New Statesman, Airmail, Idler magazine, and Scribd. The book was shortlisted for the Tata LitLive prize, and longlisted for the Chautauqua prize. 

Early life and education

Kapur was born to an Indian father and American mother and raised near Auroville. He attended boarding school in the United States when he was sixteen. Kapur graduated summa cum laude from Harvard University with a major in Social Anthropology. He has a DPhil in Socio-Legal Studies from Oxford University (Nuffield College), which he attended as a Rhodes Scholar. He also attended the SAIIER (Sri Aurobindo International Institute of Educational Research) school in Auroville, where he grew up, and Phillips Academy, Andover.

Career

Writing and journalism
Kapur has published in a variety of newspapers and magazines, including The Atlantic, The Economist, Granta, The New York Times, Outlook, The New Yorker, and Time magazine. He is the former "Letter from India" columnist for the international New York Times. In 2010, his columns for the New York Times received an "Honorable Mention" award by The Society of Publishers in Asia (SOPA), which praised Kapur's "brilliant accounts of developments in modern India." His writing covers a variety of topics, including utopianism, technology and society, economic development, and tennis. Kapur's travel writing has also appeared in Condé Nast Traveler,  Travel and Leisure, and The Atlantic, and includes reports from Romania, Poland, Turkey Switzerland, and Thailand.

Kapur has spoken several times on NPR radio in America, public radio in Australia, and NDTV in India. Kapur speaks fluent French, and has also spoken on several radio and TV programs in France, including on France 24,
 France Inter, and Radio France Internationale. India Becoming was published in France under the title L'Inde de Demain (2014, Albin Michel).

Kapur is particularly known for his writings on utopianism and the potential and limits of idealism. In his writing and interviews, Kapur has expressed skepticism about the utopian impulse and referred to himself as an "incrementalist." This position has sometimes drawn criticism, but Kapur states that his views are shaped by his own upbringing in a utopian society and his firsthand experience of the extremism to which utopianism often leads. Kapur states that he has spent time studying and traveling in Eastern Europe, and this informs his views of utopianism.

 India Becoming 
Published in 2012, India Becoming: A Portrait of Life in Modern India is an account of change and transformation in India, told through a handful of characters whose lives are followed by the author over time.  The book was selected by The New Yorker and The New Republic as a Best Book of 2012; by Newsweek as one of its three Must Reads on Modern India; and by The New York Times Book Review as an "Editors' Choice." The book was short listed for the Shakti Bhatt Prize, and an episode from the book was excerpted in The New Yorker magazine. In Time magazine, Pico Iyer wrote that India Becoming was "impressively lucid and searching" and added that, "In his clarity, sympathy and impeccably sculpted prose, Kapur often summons the spirit of V.S. Naipaul." The Financial Times wrote that "the book reads like a novel" and that "Kapur’s skill is to get people talking and to weave their stories into a necessarily messy debate about India’s future."

 Auroville: Dream and Reality Auroville: Dream and Reality (Penguin 2018) is an anthology of writing from the intentional community of Auroville, where Kapur grew up. The book contains numerous archival writings and photos seeking to demystify daily life in the community.

 Better to Have Gone 
Published in July 2021, Better to Have Gone: Love, Death and the Quest for Utopia in Auroville is part family memoir, part history, and part mediation on the nature of faith, idealism, and the utopian impulse. A mix of genres, it starts as a standard non-fiction narrative, but is increasingly augmented by relevant remarks and reflections of an autobiographical nature. Auroville's uniqueness and spirit, controversial struggles, dramatic events, and current status are presented chronologically, in an easy journalistic style. Portraits of key community figures, including, Sri Aurobindo Ghose (1872–1950), Mirra Alfassa [the Mother] (1878–1973), Satprem (1923–2007), and Amrit (born 1943), are drawn. Lives of residents are followed, two well-known Aurovilians: Kapur's wife's mother, Diane Maes (1950–1986), and her partner John Walker (1942–1986). Kapur himself and his wife Auralice Graft (born 1972) are interested participants. Occasional poetic passages contribute nuance and seasoning to the text. John's letters also are quoted many times.Alisha Haridasani Gupta, "When utopia met dystopia, they were there", in The New York Times, July 15, 2021. Accessed August 16, 2021.

The book was widely reviewed and covered in the media, including a profile of the author and his wife in the New York Times, two reviews in the New York Times, and multiple radio interviews, including with Terry Gross on NPR's Fresh Air. In a cover review for the New York Times Book Review, Amy Waldman wrote: "This is a haunting, heartbreaking story, deeply researched and lucidly told, with an almost painful emotional honesty — the use of present tense weaving a kind of trance. I kept wanting to read “Better to Have Gone” because I found it so gripping; I kept wanting not to read it because I found it so upsetting. The image that came to mind, again and again, was of human lives being dashed against the rocks of rigid belief."Better to Have Gone was selected as an "Editor's Choice" by the New York Times and was named a book of the year by The New York Times, The Wall Street Journal ("Writers' Favorite Books"), CNN, The New Statesman, Airmail, Idler magazine, and Scribd. The book was shortlisted for the Tata LitLive prize, longlisted for the Chautauqua prize. It was an Amazon bestseller and received a Whiting Nonfiction Grant. In its citation, the Whiting prize jury stated: "This book is a moving fusion of memoir, history, and ethnography that will inject new life into these forms. As an investigation into an unsolved mystery, it is compelling; as a meditation on the promise and the limitations of utopianism, it could have global resonance. ... By evoking the everyday in precise detail, Kapur brings utopianism as lived practice to technicolor life.  In attempting to locate the shifting border between extremism and idealism, he has written a book rooted in memory but in dialogue with the present day."

 Technology and Society 
Kapur's PhD thesis at Oxford focused on the effects of new technologies on economic and social development. He has frequently written on the intersection of technology and society, including for the Economist and the Wall Street Journal''. He has also consulted for a variety of organizations on related topics, including the United Nations Development Program (UNDP) and The Markle Foundation. Kapur is the author of "Internet Governance," published by UNDP, a manual widely used by policymakers in Asia and developing countries. He is a non-residential Senior Fellow at The GovLab, New York University, an organization that explores the intersection of technology and governance, with a particular emphasis on open and shared data, and the potential of "data collaboration." Kapur is also a member of the Academic Council of Krea University, a new university in India that seeks to reimagine liberal arts for the twenty first century.

References

External links
 
 Akash Kapur at Penguin India

Living people
1974 births
American male journalists
American writers of Indian descent
Harvard University alumni
Alumni of Nuffield College, Oxford